Timothy Conway may refer to:

 Timmy Conway (born 1942), Irish politician
 Timothy Conway (executive), American businessman